Paramakudi division is a revenue division in the Ramanathapuram district of Tamil Nadu, India.

References 
 

Ramanathapuram district